Christien Meindertsma (born 1980) is a Dutch artist and designer.

Personal life and education

Christien Meindertsma was born in Utrecht in the Netherlands.  She attended Design Academy Eindhoven and graduated in 2003. She trained under Hella Jongerius. She lives and works in Asperen.

Work

Meindertsma's work often examines the use of raw material. Her first major work was Checked Baggage, which is a book. The book has photographs of 3,267 items that were collected from airline passengers at the security checkpoints at Amsterdam Schiphol Airport. Her next book, PIG 05049, is about how many ways one pig can be used by people in manufacturing. PIG 05049 is in the collection of the Museum of Modern Art. She has created art for The Nature Conservancy. In 2010, Meindertsma presented a TED Talk about the book. She has designed lamps out of flax and has done projects for Droog. She has also designed sweaters. Each sweater uses wool from one specific Dutch sheep. In 2012 she was artist in residence at the Textielmuseum Tilburg. She has also partnered with Thomas Eyck.

She has exhibited at the Museum of Modern Art, the Cooper-Hewitt, National Design Museum, and the Victoria & Albert Museum. Aside from the Museum of Modern Art, her work is also held in the collections of the Zuiderzee Museum and the Fries Museum.

References

Bibliography
 Meindertsma, Christien. PIG 05049. Flocks.

External links
 Official Christien Meindertsma website
 Interview with Meindertsma about on ArtBabble
 

Dutch designers
1980 births
Living people
Artists from Utrecht
Design Academy Eindhoven alumni
Artists from Rotterdam
21st-century Dutch artists
21st-century Dutch women artists